Michael Cyril William Hunter  (born 1949) is emeritus professor of history in the department of history, classics and archaeology and a fellow of Birkbeck, University of London.  Hunter is interested in the culture of early modern England.  He specialises in the history of science in seventeenth- and early eighteenth-century England, particularly the work of Robert Boyle. In Noel Malcolm's judgement, Hunter "has done more for Boyle studies than anyone before him (or, one might almost say, than all previous Boyle scholars put together)".

Education
Hunter read history at Jesus College, University of Cambridge, England from 1968 to 1972. He then attended Worcester College, Oxford, where he received a DPhil.

Career
After a brief stay at the University of Reading Hunter joined Birkbeck, University of London in 1976.

Hunter's first monograph focused on the English antiquary and natural philosopher John Aubrey. Since then he has written extensively on the history of science and intellectual thought in England during the seventeenth and early eighteenth centuries, in particular the Royal Society.

His most substantial scholarly achievement is his edition of Boyle's Works (with Edward Davis, 14 vols, 1999–2000) and Correspondence (with Antonio Clericuzio and Lawrence Principe, 6 vols, 2001).

From 2006 to 2009 Hunter directed the creation of a digital library focusing on British printed images before 1700.

He received the 2011 Roy G. Neville Prize from the Chemical Heritage Foundation for his biographical work Boyle: Between God and Science. He also received the 2011 Robert Latham medal from the Samuel Pepys Club. In his honour, when he retired in 2013, the Birkbeck Early Modern Society held a conference on "Science, Magic and Religion in the Early Modern Period".

Hunter has been a wary defender of his turf, with scholars Steven Shapin and Simon Schaffer observing he has been "consistently hostile" to their more recent work on Robert Boyle.

Personal life
Hunter is a motorcycle enthusiast who likes two-stroke racing bikes.  He lives in Hastings, East Sussex.

Works
 
Other academic books include:
John Aubrey and the Realm of Learning. London: Duckworth, 1975. 
Science and Society in Restoration England. Cambridge: Cambridge University Press, 1981. 
The Royal Society and Its Fellows, 1660–1700: The Morphology of an Early Scientific Institution. BSHS monographs, 4. Chalfont St. Giles: British Society for the History of Science, 1982. 
Establishing the New Science: The Experience of the Early Royal Society. Woodbridge: Boydell Press, 1989. 
(with David Wootton). Atheism from the Reformation to the Enlightenment. Oxford: Clarendon Press, 1992. 
Robert Boyle Reconsidered. Cambridge: Cambridge University Press, 1994. 
Science and the Shape of Orthodoxy: Intellectual Change in Late Seventeenth-Century Britain. Woodbridge: Boydell Press, 1995. 
Robert Boyle (1627–91): Scrupulosity and Science. Woodbridge: Boydell Press, 2000. 
The Occult Laboratory: Magic, Science, and Second Sight in Late Seventeenth-Century Scotland. Woodbridge: Boydell Press, 2001. 
(with Edward Bradford Davis). The Boyle Papers: Understanding the Manuscripts of Robert Boyle. Aldershot: Ashgate, 2007. 
Editing Early Modern Texts: An Introduction to Principles and Practice. Basingstoke: Palgrave Macmillan, 2007. 
 Boyle : between God and Science, New Haven: Yale University Press, 2009. 
 The Image of Restoration Science : The Frontispiece to Thomas Sprat's History of the Royal Society (1667). London: Routledge, 2016. 
 The Decline of Magic. London: Yale University Press, 2020

References

Historians of science
British book editors
Academics of Birkbeck, University of London
Fellows of the British Academy
Fellows of the Royal Historical Society
Living people
1949 births
People from Harting